Ampeloglypter sesostris, the Grape cane gallmaker, is a true weevil species in the genus Ampeloglypter. Research in Pennsylvania has shown no effect on berry quality or vine vigor.

References 

 
 gbif.org

Baridinae
Beetles described in 1876
Grape pest insects